Ek Do Teen may refer to:
 Ek Do Teen (film), a 1953 Hindi comedy film
 "Ek Do Teen" (song), a Hindi song from the film Tezaab and Baaghi 2